Tenterfield Shire is a local government area located in the New England region of New South Wales, Australia. The Shire is situated adjacent to the New England Highway.

The mayor of the Tenterfield Shire Council is Cr. Bronwyn Petrie, an unaligned politician.

Main towns, villages and localities
The Shire includes the town of Tenterfield and villages including Drake, Jennings, Liston, Legume, Bolivia, Sandy Flat, Stannum, Torrington, Urbenville and Mingoola. Localities include Amosfield, Boonoo Boonoo, Maryland, Sunnyside and Willsons Downfall.

Heritage listings
The Tenterfield Shire has a number of heritage-listed sites, including:
 High Conservation Value Old Growth forest
 Sunnyside, Main Northern railway: Sunnyside rail bridge over Tenterfield Creek
 Tenterfield, Railway Avenue: Tenterfield railway station
 Tenterfield, Manners Street: Tenterfield School of Arts
 Tenterfield, 225 Rouse Street: Tenterfield Post Office

Demographics
Aboriginal and Torres Strait Islander people made up 6.8 per cent of the population which is approximately two-and-a-half times above both the national and state averages of 2.5 per cent. The median age of people in the Tenterfield Shire was 47 years; significantly higher than the national median of 37 years. Children aged 0 – 14 years made up 19.0 per cent of the population and people aged 65 years and over made up 20.9 per cent of the population. Of people in the area aged 15 years and over, 50.4 per cent were married and 15.1 per cent were either divorced or separated.

Between the 2001 census and the 2011 census the Tenterfield Shire experienced nominal population growth in both absolute and real terms. When compared with total population growth of Australia for the same periods, being 5.78 per cent and 8.32 per cent respectively, population growth in the Tenterfield Shire local government area was significantly lower than the national average. The median weekly income for residents within the Tenterfield Shire was significantly below the national average; in some cases, nearly half the national average.

Meanwhile, as at the census date, compared to the national average, households in the Tenterfield Shire local government area had a significantly lower than average proportion (3.6 per cent) where two or more languages are spoken (national average was 20.4 per cent); and a significantly higher proportion (92.2 per cent) where English only was spoken at home (national average was 76.8 per cent).

Selected historical census data

Council

Current composition and election method
Tenterfield Shire Council is composed of ten councillors elected proportionally as five separate wards, each electing two councillors. All councillors are elected for a fixed four-year term of office. The mayor is by the councillors at the first meeting of the council. The most recent election was held on 10 September 2016 and the makeup of the council is as follows:

The current Council, elected in 2016, in order of election by ward, is:

References 

 
Local government areas of New South Wales
New England (New South Wales)